KLLE (107.9 FM) is located in the North Fork, California, area and broadcasts in the Fresno area known as "Zona Mx".  It is owned by Latino Media Network; under a local marketing agreement, it is programmed by former owner TelevisaUnivision's Uforia Audio Network, and broadcasts a regional Mexican format. Prior to its current format, it broadcast a Spanish adult contemporary format and before that, a format known as "Raggaeton", an Hispanic form of reggae, along with a mix of hip hop under the same calls of "KLLE".

On September 28, 2014, the former station branding "La Kalle" was changed to "Latino Mix".

On May 2, 2016, KLLE changed their format to regional Mexican, branded as "Zona MX 107.9".

Former logo

References

External links
Latino Mix website

LLE
Univision Radio Network stations
LLE